Camel Safari is a 2013 Indian Malayalam-language romance film directed by Jayaraj which narrates a love story set in Rajasthan. The movie features Arun Shankar and Pankaja Menon in the lead roles. Sekhar Menon, Tini Tom, Sabitha Jayaraj, Binu Adimaly, Neha Ramesh, Hashim Hussain, Vishnu Mohan and Anjali Ajayan plays supporting roles; Kamal Gaur, the villain of Johnnie Walker, made a comeback. The filming of Camel Safari  begun on 22 November 2012 at the Pushkar Fair in Rajasthan. It was completed in three schedules with the maximum being shot in Rajasthan (Jodhpur, Jaisalmer, Bikaner and Camel safari in Pushkar) and the rest in Cochin, Kerala. The song rights of the film were sold to Manorama Music. The film Camel Safari was released on 26 September 2013.

Plot
Dia heroine of the movie is a management student in Mangalore. She and four of her friends (Catherine, Hashim, Yamini and Chinna Gounder) visit Rajasthan for 15 days to attend a marriage. There she meets a Rajput boy Pavan and falls in love with him. What happens to her there after that in that unknown land makes the content of the film.

Cast
 Arun Shankar as Pavan
 Pankaja Menon as Diya
 Kamal Gaur as Vikram Singh
 Sekhar Menon as James Kallarakkal
 Tini Tom as College professor 
 Sabitha Jayaraj as Suparna Deedi
 Binu Adimali as Dhushyandhan
 Neha Ramesh as Yamini
 Anjali Ajayan as Catherine
 Hashim Hussain as Hashim
 Vishnu Mohan as Chinna Gounter

Reception
Camel Safari was released on 26 September 2013.

Soundtrack
Music: Deepankuran, Lyrics: Kaithapram Damodaran Namboothiri. The song "Kannum kannum" was copied from "Mere Mehboob", sung by Mohammed Rafi.

 "Aaraaro" - Aswathy Vijayan
 "Suruma" - Shakthisree Gopalan
 "Afreen" - Deepankuran
 "Halwa" - Anna Katharina Valayil
 "Kannum Kannum" - Cicily, Sinov Raj
 "Sayyan" - Aswathy Vijayan

References

External links
 
 

2013 films
2010s Malayalam-language films
Films shot in Kochi
Films shot in Rajasthan
Films shot in Jaipur
Films shot in Karnataka
Films set in Rajasthan
Films set in Karnataka
Films directed by Jayaraj